The women's 50 metre breaststroke event at the 2010 Asian Games took place on 13 November 2010 at Guangzhou Aoti Aquatics Centre.

There were 20 competitors from 14 countries who took part in this event. Three heats were held, the heat in which a swimmer competed did not formally matter for advancement, as the swimmers with the top eight times from the entire field qualified for the finals.

Wang Randi and Zhao Jin from China won the gold and silver medal respectively, Japanese swimmer Satomi Suzuki won the bronze medal.

Schedule
All times are China Standard Time (UTC+08:00)

Records

Results

Heats

Final

References

 16th Asian Games Results

External links 
 Women's 50m Breaststroke Heats Official Website
 Women's 50m Breaststroke Ev.No.4 Final Official Website

Swimming at the 2010 Asian Games